is a railway station in Kōtō, Tokyo, Japan, operated jointly by Tokyo Metro, East Japan Railway Company (JR East), and Tokyo Waterfront Area Rapid Transit (TWR).

Lines
Shin-Kiba Station is served by the following lines:

Station layout
Each of the three lines has its own station facilities.

JR East platforms
The JR East station consists of a single island platform serving two tracks.

Tokyo Metro platforms

TWR platforms

History
The Teito Rapid Transit Authority (now Tokyo Metro) station opened on 8 June 1988, as the southern terminus of the Yūrakuchō Line.

On 1 December 1988, JR East opened its Shin-Kiba Station platforms as the western terminus of the Keiyō Line. The Keiyō Line was extended from Shin-Kiba Station to Tokyo Station from 10 March 1990.

The TWR station opened on 30 March 1996, as the eastern terminus of the Rinkai Line. From 1 December 2002, JR Saikyō Line trains were extended to operate over the Rinkai Line to Shin-Kiba Station.

Station numbering was introduced to the Rinkai Line platforms in 2016 with Shin-Kiba being assigned station number R01. Later in 2016 the JR East platforms were assigned station number JE05 for the Keiyo Line.

Passenger statistics
In fiscal 2013, the JR East station was used by an average of 70,831 passengers daily (boarding passengers only), making it the 61st-busiest station operated by JR East. In fiscal 2013, the Tokyo Metro station was used by an average of 101,043 passengers per day (exiting and entering passengers), making it the 34th-busiest station operated by Tokyo Metro. In fiscal 2013, the TWR station was used by an average of 30,312 people daily (boarding passengers only). The average daily passenger figures for each operator in previous years are as shown below.

 Note that JR East and TWR figures are for boarding passengers only.

Surrounding area
 Tokyo Gate Bridge (within walking distance)
 Yumenoshima Park
 Yumenoshima Tropical Greenhouse Dome
 AgeHa nightclub and event space
 Tokyo Metro Shinkiba Depot
 Tokyo Heliport

See also

 List of railway stations in Japan

References

External links

 Tokyo Metro station information 
 JR East station information 
 TWR station information 

Railway stations in Tokyo
Keiyō Line
Tokyo Metro Yurakucho Line
TWR Rinkai Line
Stations of East Japan Railway Company
Stations of Tokyo Metro
Stations of Tokyo Waterfront Area Rapid Transit
Railway stations in Japan opened in 1988